The Inland Type Foundry was an American type foundry established in 1894 in Saint Louis, Missouri and later with branch offices in Chicago and New York City. Although it was founded to compete directly with the "type trust" (American Type Founders), and was consistently profitable, it was eventually sold to ATF.

History
Inland was founded by the three sons of Carl Schraubstadter, one of the owners of the Central Type Foundry which had shut down upon being sold to American Type Founders (ATF) in 1892. William A. Schraubstadter had been superintendent of the old foundry and, not being offered a similar position in the consolidation, founded Inland with his two brothers, Oswald and Carl Jr. At first the foundry sold type made by the Keystone Type Foundry and the Great Western Type Foundry, but soon enough was cutting and casting faces of their own. All three brothers were familiar with the foundry business and quite soon the firm began making type that was "state of the art," being point-set and having a common base-line for all faces of the same body size. This last feature was a recent innovation and, as Inland had no back stock of non-linging faces, they advertised this heavily as "Standard Line Type."

Two magazines, Practical Printer and Printers' Wit & Humor were published by the firm in order to showcase their type. In 1897 Inland bought out the Western Engravers' Supply Company of St. Louis. In 1911 the brothers sold the foundry to ATF, which divided the matrices between their own facility in Jersey City and that of their subsidiary Barnhart Brothers & Spindler in Chicago. While the other two brothers simply retired, Oswald Schraubstadter worked for ATF for many years.

Inland was arguably the most successful American type foundry, certainly the most successful of its day. Several factors were responsible for this including the experience and capability of the Schraubstadter brothers, a well designed high-quality product, an aggressive program of direct mail advertising, and reduced transport costs due to both the closeness of lead mines and the concentration of the printing industry in the Midwest and Tennessee. Another factor in their success might have been widespread resentment among printers of the "type trust," represented by ATF.

Typefaces
Inland, alone among foundries, often named their type faces after prominent customers.  Studley, for instance, was named after Robert P. Studley, a St. Louis lithographer.  The following foundry types were issued by Inland:

References
  Eckman, James, The Inland Type Foundry, 1894-1911, PAGA, vol. 8, pp. 31–52, 1960.
 

Letterpress font foundries of the United States
Design companies established in 1894
Design companies disestablished in 1911
1894 establishments in Missouri
1911 disestablishments in Missouri
Metal companies of the United States
Manufacturing companies based in Philadelphia